Israel Deshon Raybon (born February 5, 1973) is a former American football defensive end who played two seasons in the National Football League with the Pittsburgh Steelers and Carolina Panthers. He was drafted by the Pittsburgh Steelers in the fifth round of the 1996 NFL Draft. Raybon played college football at the University of North Alabama and attended Lee High School in Huntsville, Alabama. He has also been a member of the New York/New Jersey Hitmen and Grand Rapids Rampage.

External links
Just Sports Stats
Fanbase profile

Living people
1973 births
Players of American football from Alabama
American football defensive ends
African-American players of American football
North Alabama Lions football players
Pittsburgh Steelers players
Carolina Panthers players
New York/New Jersey Hitmen players
Grand Rapids Rampage players
Sportspeople from Huntsville, Alabama
21st-century African-American sportspeople
20th-century African-American sportspeople